Heinz Winkler (7 July 1910 – 25 June 1958) was an East German Christian Democratic politician.

Winkler was born in Chemnitz, Saxony. He was trained as an architect. In 1938 he joined the Nazi Party. From 1941 to 1945 he was a Wehrmacht soldier. After the war he joined the Christian Democratic Union (CDU) in the Soviet Occupation Zone in 1945. Until 1953 Winkler was the leader of a reconstruction bureau, responsible for the reconstruction of the city of Chemnitz.

From 1953 to 1958 Winkler was the head of the architectural bureau that designed the new East German city of Stalinstadt (re-named Eisenhüttenstadt in 1960). 

From 1954 Winkler was a member of the Executive Committee of the CDU and since 1956 a member of the Presidium of the CDU. 

Winkler died after a car accident.

See also
 Christian Democratic Union (East Germany)

1910 births
1958 deaths
People from Chemnitz
Nazi Party politicians
Christian Democratic Union (East Germany) politicians
Road incident deaths in Germany